Telecommunications in Puerto Rico includes radio, television, fixed and mobile telephones, and the Internet.

Broadcasting in Puerto Rico is regulated by the US Federal Communications Commission (FCC).

History
The Puerto Rico Communications Authority was created with Law No. 212, on May 12, 1942. Five years later, the department was located at 1314 Juan Ponce de León Avenue in Santurce.

Radio 

 Stations: 140 radio stations (as of January 2015).

Television 

WIPR-TV ("Wonderful Island of Puerto Rico") was inaugurated on January 26, 1949.
 Stations: more than 30 TV stations operating; three stations of the US Armed Forces Radio and Television Service; cable TV subscription services are available (2007). 
 Television sets: 1.0 million sets (1997).

Telephones 

 Calling code-area codes: +1-787, +1-939
 International call prefix: 00
 Main lines: 780,200 lines in use, 87th in the world (2012).
 Mobile cellular: 3.1 million lines, 130th in the world (2012).
 System: modern digital system integrated with that of the United States (2011).
 Satellite earth stations: Intelsat with high-speed data capability (2011).
 Communications cables: provide connectivity to the US, Caribbean, Central and South America (2011).

Internet 
Hurricane Maria destroyed the internet systems in Puerto Rico in September 2017. Then in 2019, the US Federal Communications Commission stated $950 million had been approved for the rebuilding and strengthening of Puerto Rico's and the Virgin Island's internet infrastructure.

 Top-level domain: .pr
 Internet users: 1.9 million users, 92nd in the world; 51.4% of the population, 83rd in the world (2012).
 Fixed broadband: available to 65% of Puerto Ricans (2012).
 Wireless broadband: available to 98.7% of Puerto Ricans (2012).
 Available broadband technologies as a percentage of population: 48.2% DSL, 0.1% Fiber, 59.6% cable, 84.7% wireless (2012).
 Internet hosts: 469 hosts, 184th in the world (2012).
 IPv4: 1 million addresses allocated, less than 0.05% of the world total, 250.2 addresses per 1000 people (2012).
 Internet Service Providers: 19 ISPs (1999).

Internet censorship and surveillance

See also

 Economy of Puerto Rico
 Internet Exchange of Puerto Rico, no longer operating as of 2011.
 Media of Puerto Rico

References

External links 
 About NIC.pr, the registrar for the .pr top-level domain name.
 Internet Society Puerto Rico
 Federal government grants to expand broadband Internet access in Puerto Rico, Broadband USA.
 Puerto Rico summary, National Broadband Map, 31 December 2012.
 Radio Puerto Rico
 El Nuevo Dia
 WIPR-TV 6 & WIPM-TV 3

 
Puerto Rico